Greater Copenhagen Light Rail is a planned electric light rail system crossing the lines of the S-train in Greater Copenhagen, Denmark, parallel to but outside the borders of Copenhagen Municipality. Its first stage is known as the Ring 3 Light Rail, for which construction started in 2018. It will go from Lundtofte Park north of Copenhagen to Ishøj station in the southwest, and it is expected to open in 2025, with an annual ridership of 13-14 million projected. The line will be owned by the Ringby-Letbanesamarbejdet (Ring city-Light rail cooperation), which is a collaboration between the municipalities serviced or affected by the line.

Background

Currently the rapid transit network of greater Copenhagen consists of a metro line serving the city centre, south-eastern suburbs and one western suburb, and a well-developed S-train network consisting of radial lines and one inner ring line relatively close to the city centre. Further from the city centre, transport between the radials consists of bus lines. Since the suburbs along the radials are expected to grow, a better quality public transport solution between them will be needed. Furthermore, some high passenger volume destinations such as the Technical University and two hospitals are not yet directly accessible through rapid transit.

Services
Trains will depart every 5 minutes from both terminals The trip between the terminals will be completed in 55 minutes.

Stations
In total the line will have 29 stations, six of which will have a connection to the S-train network. 

Source:

Financing and ownership
The line will be owned through the Ringby-Light rail cooperation by the Ministry of Transport, Capital Region of Denmark and the municipalities of Lyngby-Taarbæk, Gladsaxe, Herlev, Albertslund (no station;in Glostrup, bordering Albertslund), Rødovre, Glostrup, Brøndby, Hvidovre (no station), Vallensbæk, Ishøj and Høje-Taastrup (no station). The Danish state will contribute 40% to the construction, the municipalities 34% and the Capital Region of Denmark will contribute 26%.

Further expansions
Several expansion stages are proposed, including a branch from Park Allé via Brøndby Stadium and Brøndby Strand station to Avedøre Holme. This can also be extended to Copenhagen Airport. Likewise, a northern extension to Kokkedal Station is proposed. This, together with an HH-connection may be a small part of a future ring around the Øresund with rail traffic.

See also
Transport in Copenhagen

External links
 Project website
 The line in the Copenhagen region rapid transit network (in yellow)
 Planned course of the line

References

Rail transport in Copenhagen
Public transport in Denmark
Light rail
Tram transport in Denmark
Tram and light rail transit systems under construction
Proposed transport infrastructure in Denmark
2025 in rail transport